Alexander Hollweg  (26 December 1936–20 January 2020) was a British painter and sculptor.

Early life and education 
He was born in Kensington, London, one of two sons of British novelist and author Barbara Wadsworth (daughter of the painter Edward Wadsworth and violinist Fanny Eveleigh) and the German Olympic ice-hockey player, businessman and amateur jazz piano player Joachim Albrecht von Bethmann-Hollweg, who came to England from Germany in 1934. His elder brother Dietrich (now Derek) von Bethmann-Hollweg, born in 1934, is an actor, and former international personnel manager for Shell. 

He went to Ashdown House, followed by Charterhouse School, and then studied French and German at New College, Oxford.

Family heritage
His family name and that of his wife and children remains officially von Bethmann-Hollweg, and some of his work is signed thus. He was the second cousin once removed of Theobald von Bethmann Hollweg who was, until 1917, Chancellor of Germany under Kaiser Wilhelm II.

Professional career
After university Hollweg studied painting at Camberwell School of Art, from 1960 to 1963. His many exhibitions in the UK included one-man shows at the Whitechapel Gallery in 1971, the Redfern Gallery, the Felicity Samuel Gallery (1972-77), the Marina Henderson Gallery and the Gordon Samuel Gallery. He exhibited regularly and successfully in the 1970s and 1980s in New York (the Kornblee Gallery) and in northern Italy, in Venice (the Gabriella Cardazzo Gallery) and Vicenza (the Tino Ghelfi Gallery). He drew and painted at the National Theatre in London.

He taught at Maidstone College of Art and Bristol Polytechnic.

Hollweg's work in public collections includes "Country Dance", a woodcut (printed by Lizzie Cox) in the Tate's Collection, part of a portfolio of prints commissioned by Bernard Jacobsen Gallery to celebrate the bicentenary of John Constable, alongside other contemporary artists including David Hockney. There are several works by Hollweg in hospitals in his adopted home county of Somerset, and in the Royal Brompton Hospital and Harefield  Hospital in Chelsea, London. Three of his paintings are held at the Ystrad Mynach  campus of Coleg y Cymoedd in Wales.
 
He continued to produce commissions for private patrons and to sell from his studio in Somerset. In 2000 and 2004 he produced two large-scale murals for the Charlotte Street Hotel and the Soho Hotel in central London. These were commissioned by Kit and Tim Kemp of Firmdale Hotels. 
 
Hollweg was also a semi-professional musician, playing mostly guitar and ukulele and singing with a number of successful lighthearted jazz bands in West Somerset, primarily his own band Dr Jazz. He also played E flat bass or tuba for more than 30 years with his local West Somerset Brass band in Watchet.

Publications
 Brick Wall (1973), 10pp, Bernard Jacobson (picture book)

Personal and family life 
In 1962 he married Geraldine James, a silversmith and enameller, in her home town of Melbourne, Derbyshire. She trained as a painter at the Ruskin School of Drawing and Fine Art, Oxford and worked as a scene painter at the Royal Shakespeare Company. 

Hollweg and his wife lived  in Bedford Park, London. They had two children: Rebecca Hollweg (1964), a singer and songwriter and Lucas Hollweg (1967), chef and food writer. They all moved to rural West Somerset in 1973 and lived on the edge of Exmoor at Nettlecombe. 

Alexander Hollweg died at home in Nettlecombe, West Somerset on 20 January 2020. He is buried in the graveyard there, in front of the farm and field depicted in his "Country Dance" print.

References

Further reading
 Glazebrook, Mark (1983). 5 modern British artists: Richard Gale, Alexander Hollweg, John Napper, John Tunnard, Edward Wadsworth, self-published.

1936 births
2020 deaths
20th-century English artists
20th-century English musicians
21st-century English artists
Alumni of New College, Oxford
English painters
English people of German descent
English sculptors
People educated at Ashdown House
People educated at Charterhouse School
People from Kensington
Von Bethmann-Hollweg family